Shandaar is a 1990 Indian Hindi-language film directed by Vinod Dewan, starring Mithun Chakraborty, Meenakshi Seshadri and Mandakini. The dialogues of this movie became a hit and were applauded by the audience, to the credit of Iqbal Durrani.

Cast
 Mithun Chakraborty as Shankar
 Meenakshi Seshadri as Rani
 Mandakini as Anita Chaurasia	
 Juhi Chawla as Tulsi
 Sumeet Saigal as Ashok
 Kader Khan as Rai Bahadur Arjun Chaurasia
 Danny Denzongpa as Daaga

Music
"Sawan Barasata Hai" – Mohammed Aziz, Anuradha Paudwal
"Meri Umar Kunwari" – Mohammed Aziz, Alka Yagnik
"Haath Mein Mehndi" – Mohammed Aziz, Kavita Krishnamurthy
"Bade Logo Ki Badi Baat" – Anuradha Paudwal, Alka Yagnik, Shabbir Kumar
"Ek Main Hoon Ek Tu Hai" – Alisha Chinai, Kishore Kumar

References

External links
 

1990 films
Films scored by Bappi Lahiri
1990s Hindi-language films